Alexei Alexeyevich Bereglazov (born 20 April 1994) is a Russian professional ice hockey defenceman. He is currently playing with Avangard Omsk in the Kontinental Hockey League (KHL).

Playing career
In his native Russia, Bereglazov played as a youth within the junior system of Metallurg Magnitogorsk of the Kontinental Hockey League (KHL). He was selected by Metallurg in the third round, 82nd overall, in the 2011 KHL Junior Draft. Bereglazov made his Kontinental Hockey League (KHL) debut playing with his hometown Magnitogorsk during the 2013–14 KHL season.

At the conclusion of the 2016–17 season, Bereglazov signed as an undrafted free agent to his first North American contract, agreeing to a two-year, entry-level contract with the New York Rangers on April 21, 2017.

After attending the Rangers training camp, Bereglazov was reassigned to begin the 2017–18 season with their American Hockey League (AHL) affiliate, the Hartford Wolf Pack. He appeared in 13 games with the Wolf Pack, posting 4 points, before he was returned on loan to his Russian club, Magnitogorsk, on November 6, 2017. Bereglazov played out the season contributing with 3 assists in 25 games in Magnitogorsk.

On April 10, 2018, Bereglazov was placed on unconditional waivers by the Rangers, paving the way for a mutual termination of the final year of his contract with the Rangers. He immediately returned to his native Russia, rejoining his original club, Metallurg Magnitogorsk.

After three further seasons with Metallurg, with the cancellation of the playoffs to end the 2019–20 season due to the COVID-19 pandemic, Bereglazov was traded to Avangard Omsk along with Ilya Kablukov in exchange for Taylor Beck on 4 June 2020.

Career statistics

Regular season and playoffs

International

Awards and honors

References

External links

1994 births
Living people
Avangard Omsk players
Hartford Wolf Pack players
Metallurg Magnitogorsk players
Russian ice hockey defencemen
People from Magnitogorsk
Stalnye Lisy players
Sportspeople from Chelyabinsk Oblast